John Rosolu Bankole Thompson (15 December 1936 - 15 May 2021) was a Sierra Leonean judge and jurist who published several studies on the law of Sierra Leone. Bankole Thompson served on the Special Court for Sierra Leone and headed the Commission of Inquiry for the Government of Sierra Leone and the Sierra Leone Anti-corruption Commission from 2018.

Education
Thompson was born in Freetown, Sierra Leone to Sierra Leonean parents of Creole ethnicity. He was educated at Prince of Wales School in Freetown, Sierra Leone and matriculated at Fourah Bay College where he studied philosophy and liberal arts and received a bachelor's degree and master's. Following a brief career in teaching in local schools in Freetown, he was awarded a fellowship to study at Christ's College, Cambridge where he received an LLB, LLM, and a doctorate in law. He was a member of the Inner Temple and was subsequently called to the bar in England in 1971.

Career
Thompson returned to Freetown, Sierra Leone and served as a state attorney and rose to the position of principal state attorney in the Office of the Attorney General. He was subsequently appointed a legal adviser to the Mano River Union and served in this role from 1977 to 1981. He was subsequently appointed to the high court by the Government of Sierra Leone and served there between 1981 and 1987.

After being invited to the United States by a U.S. judge, through Operation Crossroads Africa, Bankole Thompson toured the United States. He decided to remain in the United States and he was appointed in 1988 as the David Brennan Endowed Professor in comparative constitutional Law at Akron University.

Subsequent to his role at Akron University, he was also appointed to the faculty of Eastern Kentucky University as a professor in the Criminal Justice and Police Studies department. He also served as the dean of graduate studies at Eastern Kentucky University.

Special Court for Sierra Leone
Bankole Thompson served alongside George Gelaga King on a three panelled judiciary on the Special Court for Sierra Leone to try cases relating to the Sierra Leone Civil War.

Commission of Inquiry for the Government of Sierra Leone
In 2018, Bankole Thompson was appointed to lead the Commission of Inquiry for the Government of Sierra Leone to investigate allegations of corruption in government.

Death
After a brief illness, Bankole Thompson died on 15 May 2021 in Freetown, Sierra Leone. He was survived by his wife, Dr Adiatu Thompson and his seven children.

Publications
The Constitutional History and Law of Sierra Leone (1961-1995)
The Criminal Law of Sierra Leone
American Criminal Procedures (a co-authored book)

Sources
https://thenewdawnliberia.com/rscsl-justice-rosolu-john-bankole-thompson-is-dead/
https://cocorioko.net/judge-bankole-thompson-dies/
https://sierraloaded.sl/news/commissions-of-inquiry-judge-bankole-thompson-dead/
https://issuu.com/christsalumni/docs/christs_mag_2016_web
https://kentuckyoralhistory.org/ark:/16417/xt73ff3m0387
http://rscsl.org/Trial_Chamber_I.html

References

Special Court for Sierra Leone judges
Sierra Leone Creole people
1936 births
2021 deaths
Fourah Bay College alumni
Members of the Inner Temple
Alumni of Christ's College, Cambridge
Sierra Leonean academics
University of Akron faculty
Eastern Kentucky University faculty